Cubanola is a genus of flowering plants in the family Rubiaceae, with large, showy, hanging flowers. They are endemic to the Dominican Republic and eastern Cuba.

Species
Cubanola domingensis (Britton) Aiello - Dominican Republic
Cubanola daphnoides (Graham) Aiello - Cuba

References

External links
Cubanola in the World Checklist of Rubiaceae

Rubiaceae genera
Chiococceae
Flora of the Caribbean